Nelly Weeton or Ellen Weeton who became Nelly Stock (25 December 1776 – 1849) was a British woman letter writer and governess.

Life
Weeton was born in Lancaster on Christmas Day 1776. She was baptised "Nelly" at St John the Evangelist's Church, Lancaster. She was named after her father's ship at his request. Her father was away when she was baptised. (Some sources call her "Ellen") Her father transported slaves and worked for privateers.

She is known for writing letters to her brother who she held in very high regard when she started to copy the letters into a journal.

She married Aaron Stock at Holy Trinity Parish Church in Liverpool in 1814. She had married him at the suggestion of her brother and it worked out poorly. Her new husband abused her and in time he demanded a separation threatening that he would have her confined to an asylum if she disagreed.

Death and legacy
She died in 1849 and she left her journals to her church minister. They reappeared in a book shop in Wigan in 1925 where they were found by Edward Hall. He edited them and they were published two volumes as Miss Weeton: a Journal of a Governess in 1936.

References 
 

1776 births
1849 deaths
People from Lancaster, Lancashire
19th-century letter writers
English governesses
British letter writers